This list of cemeteries in San Bernardino County, California includes currently operating, historical (closed for new interments), and defunct (graves abandoned or removed) cemeteries, columbaria, and mausolea in San Bernardino County, California. It does not include pet cemeteries. Selected interments are given for notable people.



See also
 List of cemeteries in California
 List of cemeteries in Riverside County, California

Footnotes

External links

 San Bernardino County cemeteries at Find a Grave
 San Bernardino County at Histopolis

Cemeteries
 
History of San Bernardino County, California
Geography of San Bernardino County, California
San Bernardino County